Charles Apthorp (1698–1758) was a merchant and slave trader in Boston, colonial Massachusetts. Apthorp managed his import business from Merchants Row, and "in his day he was called the richest man in Boston." He also served in the employ of the British government for various schemes it attempted to implement in North America.

Early life 
Charles Apthorp was baptised on 28 March 1697 at St Botolph-without-Bishopsgate, London, England, to East Apthorp and Susan Ward.

Career 
Charles Apthorp emigrated with his parents to New England some time after 1698. In 1713 his father died in Boston. In the city, he served as a commissary and paymaster for the British Army and established a mercantile business. Apthorp was a successful, wealthy man,  with "imperial trading connections".

Import merchant 

Among the goods imported and/or sold through Apthorp on Merchants Row in Boston were "choice madera wines, ... a parcel of Russia duck and several sorts of European goods"; "British duck of all sorts"; "choice good sea coal, ... several second hand cables, little the worse for wear, and anchors suitable, with window glass of most sorts, and a parcel of lead and shot"; "a good new still and worm of about 600 gallons"; salt; "a parcel of guns, 4-pounders, with carriages and shott, also a parcel of swivel-guns with shott suitable;" a "well fitted" 50-ton sloop"; and "a brigantine about 90 tuns, and three years old, now lying at the Long Wharfe".

Slave trade 
Apthorp was a "venerable slave importer and one of the richest men in Boston" by 1746. At that time, slave advertisements regularly appeared in the weekly Boston Gazette. Between 1719 and 1781, there were about 2,300 slave advertisements for about 2,000 enslaved individuals. In the 1730s and 1740s he traded in slaves, posting advertisements in Boston Gazette, which one stating that he had "a parcel of likely negros just imported".

In 1733 Apthorp acted as agent for a man seeking his enslaved servant, Hannah Smyth, who had run away with a stolen diamond "and has lately been seen here in Boston." He performed a similar role in 1742, authorized to furnish "five pounds reward" for the return of a "negro man named Jack about 35 years old" to his enslaver, Stephen Eastwick. In 1756 Apthorp & Son served as agent for someone looking for an anchor lost on Cape Cod "with two iron clasps on one of the flukes, a solid pine buoy, and buoy-rope."

British government representative 
Along with Thomas Hancock, Apthorp represented the British government in its efforts to recruit personnel to Nova Scotia—ship pilots, bricklayers, carpenters, settlers, etc. He also served as "paymaster and commissary under the British Government of the land and naval forces quartered in Boston".

Apthorp and Hancock also supplied many of the ships used during the forced removal of the Acadians from Nova Scotia. The two merchants also lent money to finance the operation, and the poor quality of ships supplied by Apthorp and Hancock led to instances of malnutrition, disease and death among the Acadians on board.

Personal life

Marriage and children 
Apthorp married Grizzel Eastwicke on 13 January 1726. She was born in Jamaica to Griselda Lloyd and John Eastwicke. A descendant of the couple, great-grandson Joseph Coolidge, stated that: "Her portrait, painted by Sir Peter Lely, and showing her to have been remarkably beautiful, remains in the family." She was said to have "rare qualities of person and character."

Apthorp and his wife had eighteen children, three whom died before him. The children included: 
 Charles Ward Apthorp (later of Apthorp Farm). Charles married Mary McEvers. His granddaughter was Maria Eliza Van Den Heuvel, who married John Church Hamilton. His great granddaughter, Charlotte Augusta Gibbes, married John Jacob Astor III.
 Grizzel married Barlow Trecothick.
 Susan married Thomas Bulfinch on 8 October 1754. He was warden of the King's Chapel church after the Revolutionary War. They were the parents of architect Charles Bulfinch.
 John married 1st Alica Mann, sister of Horace Mann, 2nd Hannah Greenleaf daughter of Stephen Greenleaf, granddaughter of Thomas Loring. He was member of the house of Thomlinson and Trecothink. On a voyage to Charleston, South Carolina, they were lost at sea. Their children survived them, Colonel John T. Apthorp, Hannah who married Charles Bulfinch, and Frances who married Charles Vaughn.
 James was born 17 November 1731 and married Sarah Wentworth. Her family owned Wentworth Manor in Yorkshire.
 East, who became a minister. East Apthorp built in 1761 a mansion designed by Peter Harrison; it is now part of the Harvard University campus in Cambridge, Massachusetts. 
 Ann, born 18 January 1735 – 1736. She married Nathaniel Wheelwright.
 Henry (19 March 1736 – 1762)
 Stephen born 10 March 1737 – 1738
 Joseph (22 April 1739 – March 1749 – 1750)
 Elizabeth born 28 May 1740. She was married twice to men from New York: James McEvers (her eldest brother's brother-in-law), and her brother-in-law Robert Bayard, after her sister Rebecca's death.
 Thomas born 19 October 1741. After his father's death and until 1776, Thomas was made paymaster to British forces. He went to England, married in Lisbon and died in Ludlow, Wales.
 Rebecca born 20 June 1746. She married Robert Bayard from New York. 
 William born 26 February 1749. He married Mary Thompson.

There were also three children born between 1742 and 1745 who died as young children: Catherine, George, and Robert. A second daughter Catherine was born in 1750; She died on the date of her birth.

The family had a home in Boston and another outside town in Quincy, Massachusetts.

Religion 

He helped to found Trinity Church, Boston and was one of the first churchwardens of that church.

He was a churchwarden at the King's Chapel in Boston, starting in 1731 when he and other churchwardens met weekly and conducted affairs for the church, including hiring, assigning pews in the church, managing finances and interacting with members about church operations. Apthorp, "of the old tenor, contributed £200 towards the cost of a new church building; If sufficient funds were not raised within the church congregation, he agreed to pay an additional £1,000. He was elected to manage treasury of the new building funds.

He was a leading, "noteworthy" member of the church who was: "Warden in 1731-1732, 1743-1744, treasurer of the Building Committee, and a generous subscriber to the new church.

His large family filled two family pews in the church.

Among the Apthorp's personal possessions were "a set of eight chairs ... probably purchased from the chairmaker and upholsterer Samuel Grant, [with] carving ... attributed to John Welch."

Portraits 
Portraits were made of Charles Apthorp by Joseph Blackburn; and John Singleton Copley.

Family portraits at the Museum of Fine Arts, Boston as of 1908 include works by Robert Feke and Hartwell:
 Portrait of Charles Apthorp, by Robert Feke
 Portrait of Griselda Eastwicke Apthorp, by Robert Feke
 Portrait of Mrs. Barlow Trecothick, by Robert Feke
 Portrait of Griselda Eastwicke, by Hartwell

The Fine Arts museum's collection now contains miniatures, a few portraits and silverware from the Apthorp family.

Death 
Apthorp died suddenly in November 1758; he complained "of a slight cold a few minutes before he expired." A New England newspaper described him as "the greatest and most noble merchant on this continent." Twelve days after his death, his funeral was held at King's Chapel. It was "attended by very many gentlemen of distinction and principal inhabitants of the town. The streets and windows of the houses, as the solemnity passed along, were thronged with spectators. ... [At King's Chapel] the Reverend Mr. Caner preached a suitable sermon to a crowded audience."

A wall marker carved by Henry Cheere memorializes Apthorp inside King's Chapel; it "is crowned by a cherub weeping over a cinerary urn."

In a book written in 1910, Apthorp left a fortune equal to $150,000.

After her husband died Grizzel lived near the Central House on Brattle Square [Dock Square at Brattle Street]. She died at 88 years of age in 1796 in the home of her son, John in Quincy. A notice of her death described her as virtuous, amiable, charitable and well-regarded.

Images

See also
 Apthorp Farm
 Calf Island (Massachusetts)
 Long Island (Massachusetts)

References
Notes

Citations

Further reading

 Henry Caner. The nature & necessity, of an habitual preparation for death & judgment. A sermon preach'd at King's-Chapel in Boston, 21 November. 1758. Upon occasion of the death of Charles Apthorp, esq. Boston: New-England: Printed by John Draper, 1758.
 Foote. Annals of King's Chapel. Boston: Little, Brown, 1896. (Includes reproductions of portraits of Charles and Grizzell)
 John A. Schutz. Succession Politics in Massachusetts, 1730–1741. William and Mary Quarterly, Third Series, Vol. 15, No. 4 (October 1958), pp. 508–520.

External links

 WorldCat. Apthorp, Charles 1698-1758
 Portrait of Mrs. Charles Apthorp (Grizzell Eastwick Apthorp). By Robert Feke, 1748
 Newberry Library, Chicago. Charles Apthorp's outgoing correspondence to London merchant, John Thomlinson, dated from April 1738 to April 1739 and August 1751.

1698 births
1758 deaths
18th century in Boston
American Episcopalians
American slave traders
Burials at King's Chapel Burying Ground
Businesspeople from Boston
Colonial American merchants
Kingdom of England emigrants to Massachusetts Bay Colony
People educated at Eton College
People of colonial Massachusetts